The following is a list of the monastic houses in County Fermanagh, Northern Ireland.

Notes

References

See also
List of monastic houses in Ireland

Monastic houses
Monastic houses
Fermanagh
Monastic houses